Mougalaba is a department of Ngounié Province in Gabon. It had a population of 1,490 in 2013.

References 

Departments of Gabon